John Ericsson, Victor of Hampton Roads (Swedish: John Ericsson - segraren vid Hampton Roads) is a 1937 Swedish historical drama film directed by Gustaf Edgren and starring Victor Sjöström, Märta Ekström and Anders Henrikson. It is a biopic of the nineteenth century Swedish engineer and inventor John Ericsson, known for his work in Britain and the United States. The title refers to the 1862 Battle of Hampton Roads in the American Civil War, which featured the USS Monitor designed by Ericsson.

It was shot at the Råsunda Studios in Stockholm. The film's sets were designed by the art director Arne Åkermark. It was produced and distributed by Svensk Filmindustri.

Cast
 Victor Sjöström as 	John Ericsson
 Märta Ekström as 	Amelia Ericsson 
 Anders Henrikson as 	Taylor
 Sigurd Wallén as 	Karl 'Charlie' Petterson
 Kotti Chave as 	James Kerrigan
 Hilda Borgström as Ann Cassidy
 Carl Barcklind as 	Stephen Mallory
 Marianne Aminoff as 	Mary
 Ivar Kåge as Harry Delameter
 Olof Winnerstrand as 	Smith
 Richard Lund as 	Paulding 
 Erik Rosén as 	Davis 
 Helga Görlin as 	Jenny Lind
 Edvin Adolphson as 	Sanders
 Jussi Björling as 	Singer
 Knut Frankman as Seaman
 Gunnar Sjöberg as 	Seaman
 Carl Ström as 	Chief Guard
 Eric Abrahamsson as 	Clerk at the Navy Department 
 Greta Almroth as 	Amelia's friend in England 
 Carl August Andersson as 	First mate on 'Minnesota' 
 Bror Berger as 	Unemployed 
 Olle Björklund as 	Lieutenant on 'Merrimac' 
 Gösta Bodin as 	Phineas Taylor Barnum, Jenny Lind's agent 
 Carl Deurell as Foreman 
 Bengt Djurberg as 	Lieutenant on 'Monitor' 
 John Ericsson as Abraham Lincoln, president of the US
 August Falck as 	Sailor 
 George Fant as 	Lieutenant on 'Monitor' 
 Georg Fernqvist as 	Officer 
 Emil Fjellström as 	Worker 
 Gösta Grip as 	Confederate Minister 
 Wictor Hagman as 	Sailor 
 Hester Harvey as 	Black girl 
 Folke Helleberg as 	Officer
 John Hilke as Jefferson Davis, president of the Confederacy
 Torsten Hillberg as 	Judge 
 Anders Holmgren as	Train driver 
 Helge Karlsson as Soldier on 'Monitor' 
 Helge Kihlberg as 	Young man at the station 
 Alf Kjellin as 	Young man on Delamater's office 
 Axel Lagerberg as 	Member of the Marine Committee 
 Herman Lantz as 	Young man waiting for the Cunard Ferry 
 Axel Lindberg as Lincoln's secretary 
 Richard Lindström as Chairman of the Marine Committee 
 Walter Lindström as 	Member of the Marine Committee 
 Gösta Lycke as 	Commander on 'Minnesota' 
 Helge Mauritz as 	Singer 
 Nils Nordståhl as Commander on 'Cumberland' 
 Yngve Nyqvist as 	General Robert E. Lee 
 Gabriel Rosén as 	Confederate Chief of Guards 
 Robert Ryberg as 	Draft officer 
 Ingeborg Strandin as Worried mother 
 Eric von Gegerfelt as 	Confederate minister 
 James Westheimer as 	Sailor 
 John Westin as 	Member of Congress 
 Charles White as Jim, negro 
 Oscar Åberg as Manager of the Confederate Shipyard

References

Bibliography 
 McIlroy, Brian. World Cinema: Sweden. Flicks Books, 1986.
 Qvist, Per Olov & von Bagh, Peter. Guide to the Cinema of Sweden and Finland. Greenwood Publishing Group, 2000.
 Wallengren, Ann-Kristin.  Welcome Home Mr Swanson: Swedish Emigrants and Swedishness on Film. Nordic Academic Press, 2014.

External links 
 

1937 films
1937 drama films
Swedish historical drama films
1930s historical drama films
1930s Swedish-language films
Swedish black-and-white films
Films directed by Gustaf Edgren
Films set in England
Films set in New York City
Films set in the 19th century
1930s Swedish films